The 1980–81 Detroit Red Wings season was the Red Wings' 49th season, 55th overall for the franchise.

Offseason

Regular season

Final standings

Schedule and results

Playoffs

Player statistics

Regular season
Scoring

Goaltending

Note: GP = Games played; G = Goals; A = Assists; Pts = Points; +/- = Plus-minus PIM = Penalty minutes; PPG = Power-play goals; SHG = Short-handed goals; GWG = Game-winning goals;
      MIN = Minutes played; W = Wins; L = Losses; T = Ties; GA = Goals against; GAA = Goals-against average;  SO = Shutouts;

Awards and records

Transactions

Draft picks
Detroit's draft picks at the 1980 NHL Entry Draft held at the Montreal Forum in Montreal, Quebec.

Farm teams

See also
1980–81 NHL season

References

External links

Detroit Red Wings seasons
Detroit
Detroit
Detroit Red
Detroit Red